The Adoration of the Shepherds is a circa 1480 oil on panel by the Colmar painter-engraver Martin Schongauer in the collection of the Gemäldegalerie, Berlin.

The scene is the Adoration of the Shepherds. Mary kneels before her child, which lies on swaddling clothes. Behind her are Joseph standing with ox and donkey, and facing her are three shepherds who lean forward towards the Child Jesus. The iconography closely resembles the revelations of Bridget of Sweden which were still popular in Schongauer's time a century after she wrote them. 

These include the elderly features of Joseph contrasted with the youthful features of the Virgin, her praying hands, her loose blond curly hair, and the miraculously clean and painless birth with the child sprouting spontaneously from its kneeling mother's womb keeping her virginity intact with no visible umbilical cord or afterbirth. Schongauer was probably influenced by Flemish painters such as Rogier van der Weyden and Hans Memling that he had seen on trips to Spain or Flanders. In turn his placement of the figures was an influence on later painters such as Albrecht Dürer and Hans Burgkmair the Elder.

The painting was purchased for the museum in 1902 by the museum friends' society called Kaiser-Friedrich-Museums-Verein. Its provenance before that is unknown.

References 

 Inventory nr. 1629 in Die Gemäldegalerie des Kaiser-Friedrich-Museums, vollständiger beschreibender Katalog, mit Abbildungen sämtlicher Gemälde, im Auftrag der Generalverwaltung der Königlichen Museen bearbeitet von Hans Posse, 1909
 290550 in RKDimages

1480s paintings
Paintings in the Gemäldegalerie, Berlin
Schongauer